Joanna Weston (born 14 February 1994) is an Australian netball player for the Melbourne Vixens in the Suncorp Super Netball league. She was part of the Australian squad that won silver at the 2018 Commonwealth Games and was selected in the Australian Diamonds squad for the 2018/19 international season.

Weston was named Player of the Finals in the 2017 Suncorp Super Netball season.

Weston grew up in Melbourne's eastern suburbs and attended Glen Iris Primary and Sacré Cœur School She is currently studying a Master of Communication at Deakin University. She also holds a Bachelor of Commerce from Melbourne University.

References

External links
 Suncorp Super Netball profile
 Melbourne Vixens profile
 Australian Diamonds profile

1994 births
Living people
Australian netball players
Australia international netball players
Netball players at the 2018 Commonwealth Games
Commonwealth Games silver medallists for Australia
Commonwealth Games medallists in netball
Netball players at the 2022 Commonwealth Games
Commonwealth Games gold medallists for Australia
2019 Netball World Cup players
Suncorp Super Netball players
Victorian Netball League players
Australian Netball League players
Victorian Fury players
Melbourne Vixens players
Netball players from New South Wales
Australian Institute of Sport netball players
Australia international Fast5 players
People educated at Sacré Cœur School
Netball players from Melbourne
University of Melbourne alumni
Medallists at the 2018 Commonwealth Games
Medallists at the 2022 Commonwealth Games